William Patrick "Foxy" Dineen (September 18, 1932 – December 10, 2016) was a Canadian professional ice hockey player and head coach. He played in the National Hockey League (NHL) for the Detroit Red Wings and Chicago Black Hawks between 1953 and 1958. The rest of his career, which lasted from 1953 to 1971, was spent in the minor leagues. After his playing career Dineen became a coach and worked in the World Hockey Association from 1972 to 1979. He was the head coach for the Houston Aeros for all six seasons before coaching the Hartford Whalers for the 1978-79 season. The architect of a team in roster construction, Dineen's Aeros reached the playoffs in every season of their history and won the Avco World Trophy twice.

He coached in the American Hockey League in the 1980s, where he won two Calder Cups with the Adirondack Red Wings. He was hired to coach the Philadelphia Flyers of the NHL from 1991 to 1993. Throughout his career, Dineen was traded for Bob Bailey on three occasions.

Playing career
He began his career by playing two seasons for the St. Michael's Majors of the OHL. He spent 5 years playing for the Detroit Red Wings from 1954-1958. He won the Stanley Cup twice with the team, in 1954 and 1955. He later played briefly for the Chicago Black Hawks. After 1958, however, he spent the rest of his playing career in the minor leagues with various teams including the Buffalo Bisons, Cleveland Barons, Rochester Americans, Quebec Aces, Seattle Totems, and the Denver Spurs.

Coaching career
After his retirement as a player Dineen went into coaching. He spent six years behind the bench of the Houston Aeros of the World Hockey Association—the entirety of the team's existence—where he coached Gordie Howe for four seasons and won two championships. After the Aeros disbanded, he was hired to coach the New England Whalers in 1978-79, but was fired late in the season. In six years with the Adirondack Red Wings he was twice named the American Hockey League's coach of the year and won two Calder Cup titles. He was later named head coach of the Philadelphia Flyers in 1992 where he got to coach his son Kevin. He was the oldest rookie coach in the history of the NHL. He was fired by the Flyers after 1993.

Honours
In 2010, he was elected as an inaugural inductee into the World Hockey Association Hall of Fame.

He was portrayed by Martin Cummins in the 2013 television film Mr. Hockey: The Gordie Howe Story.

Personal life and death
Three of his sons Gordon, Peter, and Kevin also played in the NHL. Bill Dineen died on December 10, 2016 in Queensbury, New York at the age of 84.

Career statistics

Regular season and playoffs

Coaching record

References

External links

Picture of Bill Dineen's Name on the 1954 Stanley Cup Plaque

1932 births
2016 deaths
Buffalo Bisons (AHL) players
Burials in Warren County, New York
Canadian ice hockey coaches
Canadian ice hockey right wingers
Chicago Blackhawks players
Cleveland Barons (1937–1973) players
Denver Spurs (WHL) players
Detroit Red Wings players
Ice hockey people from Quebec
Ice hockey player-coaches
New England Whalers coaches
Philadelphia Flyers coaches
Quebec Aces (AHL) players
Rochester Americans players
Seattle Totems (WHL) players
Sportspeople from Glens Falls, New York
Sportspeople from Saguenay, Quebec
St. Louis Blues scouts
Stanley Cup champions
Toronto St. Michael's Majors players
World Hockey Association coaches